Audible may refer to:
 Audible (service), an online audiobook store
 Audible (American football), a tactic used by quarterbacks
 Audible (film), a short documentary film featuring a deaf high school football player
 Audible finish or rushed finish, see Glossary of professional wrestling terms#R
 Audible frequency
 Audible range

See also
 The Audible Doctor (born 1984), record producer and rapper
 Audible Life Stream, the esoteric essence of God
 Audible Minority, a record album
 Audible line, a road safety feature
 Audible ringing tone, in telecommunication
Audio (disambiguation)
Hear (disambiguation)
Hearing (disambiguation)